This is the list of winners and nominees of the César Award for Best Costume Design (French: César des meilleurs costumes).

Winners and nominees

1980s

1990s

2000s

2010s

2020s

See also
Academy Award for Best Costume Design
BAFTA Award for Best Costume Design
Magritte Award for Best Costume Design

References

External links 
  
 César Award for Best Costume Design at AlloCiné

Costume
Awards for film costume design